The QSI International School of Yerevan (QSIY) is an international school in Yerevan, Armenia, part of the Quality Schools International group. It is an independent, coeducational day school that offers an education to children of all nationalities ages 3 to 18. QSIY was founded in 1995.

At the beginning of the 2012-2014 school year, enrollment was 158, and there were 35 full-time and 5 part-time faculty members.

QSI International School of Yerevan is the most elite school in Yerevan accepting only a small number of students every year.

The school is accredited by the MSA/CESS since 2000.

Curriculum 
The school offers an educational program with a curriculum similar to that of U.S. public and private schools. Instruction is in English.

Courses include English, mathematics, science, social studies, physical education, Russian, German, French, Armenian, computer, art and music. Soccer, basketball, karate, dance, boy scouts, girl scouts, Model United Nations, Track and Field, chess, Armenian language, and other activities are offered as after-school activities.

The elementary grades are accredited by the Middle States Association of Colleges and Schools. The school is accredited in the United States by the Middle States Association of Colleges and Schools (MSA). The school is also registered and accredited with the government of Armenia.

90% of graduating students go to colleges around the world, while the other 10% decide to remain in Armenia.

Facilities
The school moved to a new location during August 1999 and was above the office of a furniture factory. It remained there until early 2011. The school relocated to a new purpose-built multi-story location in February 2011.

The new building contains classrooms for ages 3–4 through secondary level including classrooms for art and music, a science laboratory, a kitchen and food-serving area attached to a canteen/hall with stage, a library, and a computer lab. Phase 2 of the building process will see a gymnasium attached to the school. As in the former location, the new school has a security gate with 24-hour security personnel.

External links

 School website

References 

Educational institutions established in 1995
Yerevan
Schools in Yerevan
Secondary schools in Armenia
International schools in Armenia
International high schools
International Baccalaureate schools in Armenia
1995 establishments in Armenia